The Bulacan Provincial Board is the Sangguniang Panlalawigan (provincial legislature) of the Philippine province of Bulacan.

The members are elected via plurality-at-large voting: the province is divided into six Sangguniang Panlalawigan districts, and each district send two members since 2022; the number of candidates the electorate votes for and the number of winning candidates depends on the number of members their district sends. The vice governor is the ex officio presiding officer, and only votes to break ties. The vice governor is elected via the plurality voting system province-wide.

The districts used in appropriation of members is coextensive with the legislative districts of Bulacan, with the exception that the Legislative district of San Jose del Monte being a part of the 4th provincial board district.

District apportionment

List of members
An additional three ex officio members are the presidents of the provincial chapters of the Association of Barangay Captains, the Councilors' League, the Sangguniang Kabataan provincial president; the municipal and city (if applicable) presidents of the Association of Barangay Captains, Councilor's League and Sangguniang Kabataan, shall elect amongst themselves their provincial presidents which shall be their representatives at the board.

Starting in 2017, the province also reserved a seat for its indigenous peoples.

Current members 

 Vice Governor: Alexis Castro (NUP)

Membership summary
The term of elected officials of the Sangguniang Kabataan elected in 2010 expired on November 30, 2013, and were not replaced.

Vice Governor

1st District

2nd District

3rd District

4th District

5th District

6th District

Ex officio seats

Reserved seats

References

Provincial boards in the Philippines
Government of Bulacan
Politics of Bulacan